On October 15, 1824, Charles Rich of Vermont's  died in office.  A special election was held for his replacement.

Election results

Olin took his seat in the 18th Congress on December 13, 1824.

See also
List of special elections to the United States House of Representatives

References

Vermont at-large
Vermont 1824 at-large
1824 at-large Special
Vermont at-large Special
United States House of Representatives at-large
United States House of Representatives 1824 at-large